Ryan David Burson was born 27 August 1978 in Christchurch. He is a New Zealand cricketer who played for the Canterbury Wizards. He retired from cricket in 2011.

References

External links
 Prfile at Cricinfo.

1978 births
Living people
New Zealand cricketers
Canterbury cricketers